The Rural Municipality of Montmartre No. 126 is a rural municipality (RM) in the Canadian province of Saskatchewan within Census Division No. 6 and  Division No. 1. It is located in the southeast portion of the province along Highway 48.

History 
The RM of Montmartre No. 126 incorporated as a rural municipality on December 13, 1909.

Geography

Communities and localities 
The following urban municipalities are surrounded by the RM.

Villages
Kendal
Montmartre

The following unincorporated communities are within the RM.

Organized hamlets
Candiac

The RM is adjacent to the Assiniboine 76 First Nations Indian reserve.

Parks and recreation
Kemoca Regional Park

Demographics 

Government 
The RM of Montmartre No. 126 is governed by an elected municipal council and an appointed administrator that meets on the second Tuesday of every month. The reeve of the RM is Bernard Kotylak while its administrator is Dale Brenner. The RM's office is located in Montmartre.

References 

M

Division No. 6, Saskatchewan